Neko Entertainment was a French video game developer and publisher located in a suburb of Paris, France. It was founded in 1999. Neko's productions are based on an evolutionary development platform for 3D consoles called the Neko Game Development Kit which allows the company to simultaneously develop games across all platforms and to rapidly port existing games.

Neko Entertainment made several games for 3DS, Game Boy Advance, GameCube, Nintendo DS, PlayStation 2, PlayStation 3, PlayStation 4, PlayStation Portable, PlayStation Vita, Wii, Wii U, Windows and Xbox 360.

Games developed and published

References

External links
 Official site
 Neko Entertainment from MobyGames
 Neko Entertainment from GameSpot

Video game development companies
Defunct video game companies of France
Video game companies established in 1999
Video game companies disestablished in 2017
1999 establishments in France